Brimington F.C. was an English football club based in Brimington.

History
The team participated in the Midland Football League, winning the First Division title in 1976 before resigning a year later.

References

Defunct football clubs in Derbyshire
Midland Football League (1889)
Defunct football clubs in England